Simon Beck (born 19 August 1958) is a British snow artist and a former cartographer. Referred to as the world's first snow artist, he is primarily known for his landscape drawings and sculptures created from snow and sand. His work appeared in new media after he completed installations at Banff National Park in Alberta and Powder Mountain, Utah. He later participated in Minnesota's annual snow festival, "The Great Northern".

Biography 
He was born in 1958 London and later moved to French Alps. He originally started his career in 2004. He obtained his civil engineering degree from the Oxford University, and later worked as a cartographer until he left cartography around 2009 and appeared to be involved in large-scale snow drawings. He creates about thirty drawings every winter, primarily in Alps. He creates artwork by walking over a mile on snowshoes which continues for around ten hours in completing an artwork. Sometimes, he walks about 30 miles for completing a single work from snow and uses compass to measure steps needed to complete geometrical snow designs.

Since he began creating snow art, he has created about 330 drawings of snow and 120 of sand as of 2020. Some of his artwork has been commissioned by the associated organizations or art societies around the world. In 2016, a short documentary titled Simon Beck - Snowartist was created which revolves around his artwork. The film first appeared during a short film showcase of the National Geographic.

References

External links 
 Simon Beck at MutualArt.com

1958 births
Living people
Artists from London
21st-century English artists
Alumni of the University of Oxford